Ofu or OFU may refer to

Ofu-Olosega, an island in the Manu'a group in American Samoa
Ofu Airport (IATA code OFU), a public airport on the island
Ofu County, American Samoa
Ofu, Nigeria, a town and Local Government Area in Kogi State